is a district of Shibuya, Tokyo, Japan.

As of October 2020, the population of this district is 118. The postal code for Yoyogikamizonochō is 151-0052.

Geography
Yoyogikamizonochō borders Yoyogi in the north and west, Sendagaya to the east, and Jinnan to the south.

Education
 operates public elementary and junior high schools.

Yoyogikamizonochō 1 is zoned to Sendagaya Elementary School (千駄谷小学校). Yoyogikamizonochō 2 is zoned to Jinnan Elementary School (神南小学校). Yoyogikamizonochō 3-4 is zoned to Yoyogi Sanya Elementary School (代々木山谷小学校).

Yoyogikamizonochō 1 is zoned to Harajuku Gaien Junior High School (原宿外苑中学校). Yoyogikamizonochō 2 is zoned to Shoto Junior High School (松濤中学校). Yoyogikamizonochō 3-4 is zoned to Yoyogi Junior High School (代々木中学校).

References

Neighborhoods of Tokyo
Shibuya